Joseph Giglio is a Maltese lawyer and politician who has served in the Parliament of Malta since 2022, representing District 10 as a member of the Nationalist Party. Giglio is the Shadow Minister for Home Affairs and is a Nationalist Party spokesman. Giglio was briefly considered for leadership of the Nationalist Party against incumbent leader Bernard Grech in April 2022.

A former lawyer for Pilatus Bank, Giglio came under controversy when, in a June 2022 interview, he criticized a whistleblower who had exposed a corruption scandal by Pilatus Bank in 2018; this scandal had ultimately led to the resignation of Joseph Muscat, the then-prime minister of Malta.

References 

Year of birth uncertain
Date of birth missing (living people)
Living people
1967 births
1968 births
People from Sliema
21st-century Maltese politicians
Nationalist Party (Malta) politicians
Members of the House of Representatives of Malta
20th-century Maltese lawyers
21st-century Maltese lawyers